Miot is a surname. Notable people with the surname include:

 Evelyn Miot (born 1943), Haitian beauty pageant contestant
 Joseph Serge Miot (1946–2010), Haitian archbishop
 Jules Miot (1809–1883), French political activist

See also
 Massive Internet of things (MIoT)

French-language surnames